Apollon B.C. may refer to two basketball clubs:

 Apollon Patras B.C., Greek team
 Apollon Limassol BC, Cypriot team